The following lists events that happened during 1800 in Chile.

Incumbents
Royal Governor of Chile: Joaquín del Pino Sánchez de Rojas

Events
July 3 - The city of  San Carlos is founded.

References

 
Years of the 19th century in Chile
Years in the Captaincy General of Chile
1800s in the Captaincy General of Chile
Chile
Chile